Al-Kāfirūn ("The Unbelievers") is the name of the 109th chapter (sūrah) of the Quran. It has six ayat or verses as follows:
۝ Say, "O disbelievers,
۝ I do not worship what you worship.
۝ Nor are you worshippers of what I worship.
۝ Nor will I be a worshipper of what you worship.
۝ Nor will you be worshippers of what I worship.
۝ For you is your religion, and for me is my religion."

Text and meaning

Text and transliteration
Hafs from Aasim ibn Abi al-Najud

 

 

 

 

 

 

Warsh from Nafiʽ al-Madani

Meanings

Say (O Muhammad (Peace be upon him) to these Mushrikun and Kafirun): "O Al-Kafirun (disbelievers in Allah, in His Oneness, in His Angels, in His Books, in His Messengers, in the Day of Resurrection, and in Al-Qadar, etc.)!

"I worship not that which you worship,

"Nor will you worship that which I worship.

"And I shall not worship that which you are worshipping.

"Nor will you worship that which I worship.

"To you be your religion, and to me my religion (Islamic Monotheism)."

Say, "O disbelievers,

I do not worship what you worship.

Nor are you worshippers of what I worship.

Nor will I be a worshipper of what you worship.

Nor will you be worshippers of what I worship.

For you is your religion, and for me is my religion."

Say: O ye that reject Faith!

I worship not that which ye worship,

Nor will ye worship that which I worship.

And I will not worship that which ye have been wont to worship,

Nor will ye worship that which I worship.

To you be your Way, and to me mine.

Say: O disbelievers!

I worship not that which ye worship;

Nor worship ye that which I worship.

And I shall not worship that which ye worship.

Nor will ye worship that which I worship.

Unto you your religion, and unto me my religion.

Summary
1-6 Muhammad declines to compromise with idolatry  

Like many of the shorter surahs, the surah of the unbelievers takes the form of an invocation, telling the reader something they must ask for or say aloud. Here, the passage asks one to keep in mind the separation between belief and unbelief both in the past and the present, ending with the often cited line "To you your religion, and to me mine". Although some view this as an argument against religious intolerance, others see it as a more time-specific revelation, warning the newly founded Muslim minority in Mecca against being induced (by the Quraysh Arab tribe majority) to collude with disbelievers.

It was revealed in Mecca when the Muslims were persecuted by the polytheists of Mecca.

Cause of revelation
"Wahb ibn Munabbih has related that the people of Quraish said to Allah's Messenger: 'If you like we would enter your faith for a year and you would enter our faith for a year.'" (Abd bin Humaid, Ibn Abi Hatim). "...In this way, if what you have brought us is better than what we have, we would partake of it and take our share of goodness from it; and if what we have is better than what you have brought, you would partake of it and take your share of goodness from it."

Hadith
As for the esteem in which Muhammad held this surah, it can be judged from the following few hadith:

 Abdullah ibn Umar has related that on many an occasions he heard Muhammad recite Surahs Qul Ya- ayyuhal- kafirun and Qul Huwu-Allahu ahad in the two  before the  obligatory prayer and in the two  after Maghrib prayer.
 Khabbab ibn al-Aratt says: "The Holy Prophet (upon whom be peace) said to me: when you lie down in bed to sleep, recite , and this was the Holy Prophet's own practice also; when he lay down to sleep, he recited this ."
 According to Ibn Abbas, Muhammad said to the people: "Should I tell you the word which will protect you from polytheism? It is that you should recite  when you go to bed."
 Anas says that Muhammad said to Mu'adh bin Jabal; "Recite  at the time you go to bed, for this is immunity from polytheism."
 Both Fardah bin Naufal and Abdur Rahman bin Naufal have stated that their father, Naufal bin Muawiyah al-Ashjai, said to Muhammad: "Teach me something which I may recite at the time I go to bed." Muhammad replied: "Recite  to the end and then sleep, for this is immunity from polytheism." A similar request was made by Jabalah bin Harithah, brother of Said bin Harithah, to Muhammad and to him also he gave the same reply.
 Muhammad recited in the two  before the morning prayer and the two  after the sunset prayer on ten or twenty occasions: Say  and say He is God, the One (surah 112: al-Ikhlas).

References

External links
Quran 109 Clear Quran translation
4 Qul in Quran, protection surahs
Four Qul Surahs

Kafirun